Wedgewood is a hamlet in northern Alberta, Canada within the County of Grande Prairie No. 1.

Demographics 

See also 
List of communities in Alberta
List of hamlets in Alberta

References 

County of Grande Prairie No. 1
Designated places in Alberta
Hamlets in Alberta